Eden Consolidated Independent School District is a public school district based in Eden, Texas (USA).   The district is located in southern Concho County, including Eola, and extends into a small portion of northern Menard County.

History
On September 1, 1983, Eola Independent School District merged into Eden CISD.

Academic achievement
In 2009, the school district was rated "academically acceptable" by the Texas Education Agency.

Schools
Eden Consolidated ISD has two campuses - 
Eden High School (Grades 7-12)
Eden Elementary School (Grades K-6)

Special programs

Athletics
Eden High School plays six-man football.

See also

List of school districts in Texas

References

External links
Eden Consolidated ISD

School districts in Concho County, Texas
School districts in Menard County, Texas